Belgium competed at the 2014 Winter Olympics in Sochi, Russia from 7 to 23 February 2014. The team consisted of seven athletes in five sports, one less than in 2010. The goal of the team was a few top-8 performances.

Belgian Prime Minister Elio Di Rupo did not plan to attend the 2014 Winter Olympics. He has not said publicly that the decision was a political gesture.

Bobsleigh

* – Denotes the driver of each sled

Figure skating

Belgium has achieved the following quota places:

Freestyle skiing

According to the quota allocation released on January 20, 2014, Belgium has two athletes in qualification position, but rejected 1 quota in women's ski cross.

Halfpipe

Snowboarding

According to the quota allocation released on January 20, 2014, Belgium has one athlete in qualification position.

Qualification Legend: QF – Qualify directly to final; QS – Qualify to semifinal

Speed skating

Based on the results from the fall World Cups during the 2013–14 ISU Speed Skating World Cup season, Belgium has earned the following start quotas:

Non-qualified sports

Alpine skiing

According to the quota allocation released on January 20, 2014, Belgium has six athletes in qualification position. However no alpine skiers were selected for the final team.

 Men's Events – 3 quota places
 Women's Events – 3 quota places

References

External links 

 
 

Nations at the 2014 Winter Olympics
2014
Winter Olympics